John Murphy (born April 19, 2000) is an American soccer player who currently plays as a midfielder for South Georgia Tormenta.

Early life
Born in Scotch Plains, New Jersey, Murphy came up through the academy system of the Players Development Academy in New Jersey before joining the New York Red Bulls Academy. He also played for the New York Red Bulls PDL and USL teams.

Club career

New York Red Bulls II
Prior to the 2018 season, it was announced that Murphy would be part of New York Red Bulls II of the United Soccer League as a registered academy player. Murphy then made his debut for Red Bulls II on March 27, 2018, against Atlanta United 2. He came on as an 84th-minute substitute for Steven Echevarria as Red Bulls II lost 3–1.

Loudoun United
On June 27, 2019, Murphy signed with USL Championship club Loudoun United FC for the remainder of their inaugural season. Murphy made his debut for Loudoun United on July 20, 2019, in a 2–0 loss against Indy Eleven.

Union Omaha
In April 2021, Murphy joined USL League One side Union Omaha ahead of the 2021 season. On April 24, 2021, he made his debut for Union Omaha  in a 2–0 victory against South Georgia Tormenta FC in the opening match of the USL1 season.

Return to New York Red Bulls II
On March 3, 2022, Murphy completed a deal to return to New York Red Bulls II, now a USL Championship club. On April 2, 2022, Murphy scored his first professional goal in a 3-2 loss to FC Tulsa. He scored his second goal of the season on August 20, 2022, in the 2-2 draw against Pittsburgh Riverhounds.

South Georgia Tormenta
On February 9, 2023, Murphy signed a one-year deal with USL League One side South Georgia Tormenta.

International career
Murphy has represented the US National Team at the U15, U16 and U17 level. He also participated in a U18 National Team Camp for Ireland as he holds dual citizenship.

Personal life
Murphy is the younger brother of Monterey Bay FC midfielder James Murphy.

Career statistics

References

2000 births
Living people
Association football midfielders
People from Scotch Plains, New Jersey
American soccer players
New York Red Bulls II players
Loudoun United FC players
Soccer players from New Jersey
Sportspeople from Union County, New Jersey
Tormenta FC players
Union Omaha players
USL Championship players